David Joseph O'Connell (December 25, 1868 – December 29, 1930) was an American publisher and politician who served five terms as a U.S. Representative from New York between 1919 to 1930.

Biography 
Born in New York City, O'Connell attended public schools as a child. He worked in the publishing business in New York City, eventually becoming a sales manager for Funk & Wagnalls.

In addition, he organized and was the first secretary of the 28th Ward Board of Trade and the Allied Board of Trade in Brooklyn, New York. He also served as president of the Booksellers' League of New York, as well as delegate to the Democratic National Convention in 1920.

Tenure in Congress 
O'Connell was elected as a Democrat to the 66th Congress, where he served from March 4, 1919 to March 3, 1921. He was an unsuccessful candidate for reelection to the 67th Congress in 1920. However, two years later, O'Connell was elected to the 68th Congress, as well as the three succeeding Congresses and in 1930 was reelected to the 72nd Congress. He served until his death in New York City on December 29, 1930.

Burial 
O'Connell was interred in St. John's Cemetery, Middle Village, Brooklyn, New York.

See also
List of United States Congress members who died in office (1900–49)

References

External links

1868 births
1930 deaths
Politicians from New York City
Democratic Party members of the United States House of Representatives from New York (state)